The General Assembly of Gipuzkoa (Basque Gipuzkoako Batzar Nagusiak, Spanish Juntas Generales de Gipuzkoa) is the regional unicameral parliament of the Basque province of Gipuzkoa. Members are elected by universal suffrage for a term of 4 years. Last elections were held in 2015.

Duties 
 Adoption of foral laws.
 Election of the Deputy General of Gipuzkoa (regional president).
 Approval of budgets.
 Control and impulse the activity of the Province Government of Gipuzkoa.

Presidents 
List of presidents of the General Assembly since restoration of democracy and approval of the Basque Statute of Autonomy in 1979.

See also 
 Juntas Generales

External links 
 Official website of the parliament 

Gipuzkoa